Gremialismo, or guildism, is a social, political, and economic ideology, inspired in the Catholic social teachings that claims that every correct social order should base itself in intermediary societies between persons and the state, which are created and managed in freedom, and that the order should serve only the purposes for which they were created.

History
In Chile, gremialismo was the main doctrine of the liberal-conservative movement that emerged in the second half of the 1960s and led the opposition to the University Reform of the Catholic University of Chile. Thus, it opposed the left and the center.

The principal thinker of gremialism was a lawyer and professor who was later a Pinochet advisor, Jaime Guzmán.

There has been a dispute on whether or not gremialismo thought has been influenced by Juan Vázquez de Mella.

The gremialist Javier Leturia wrote about the origins of the movement:
We [the gremialistas] were orderly, we were those that were not hippie, those that were not left-wing, those that were not potheads. I would say that the people were participative. That is why former school union leaders and people from school unions, the scouts, and religious movements were picked up. We openly supported the coup. We published a manifesto in the newspaper that read: "Towards a new institutionality through the renounce of Allende." [...] What we said was that the crisis was insurmountable and that the only solution was to have the armed forces take charge. We drafted that manifesto as university students, and it was signed by student unions from the Catholic universities of Santiago and Valparaíso, which were headed by gremialists. I would say that from the moment Allende was elected, many began to support a coup. I mean that we were not going to accept for this country to fall into communism.

Role in military dictatorship youth policy 
One of the first measures of the military dictatorship that came to power though the 1973 coup d'etat was to set up the Secretaría Nacional de la Juventud (SNJ, National Youth Office), which was done on October 28, 1973, even before the Declaration of Principles of the junta made in March 1974. It was a way of mobilizing sympathetic elements of the civil society in support for the dictatorship. The SNJ was created by the advice of Jaime Guzmán and was an example of the dictatorship adopting gremialism. Some right-wing student union leaders like Andrés Allamand were skeptical to the attempts as they were moulded from above and gathered disparate figures such as Miguel Kast, Antonio Vodanovic and Jaime Guzmán. Allamand and other young right-wingers also resented the dominance of gremialism in the SNJ since they considered it to be a closed gremialist club.

From 1975 to 1980, the SNJ arranged a series of ritualized acts in  reminiscent of Francoist Spain. The policy towards the sympathetic youth contrasted with the murder, surveillance, and forced disappearances that dissident youth faced from the regime. Most of the SJN's documents were reportedly destroyed by the dictatorship in 1988.

References

Anti-communism in Chile
Catholicism and politics
Christian democracy
Conservatism in Chile
Neoliberalism
Political ideologies
Right-wing politics in Chile